Shenzhen Airlines operates the following services (as of August 2017):

List

References

External links
Shenzhen Airlines Schedule (Chinese)

Lists of airline destinations
Star Alliance destinations